Allan Sloan (born 1944) is an American journalist, formerly senior editor at large at Fortune magazine. He is currently a columnist for The Washington Post.

Sloan was born in Brooklyn, New York and is a 1966 graduate of Brooklyn College with a B.A.; he received his M.S. as a 1967 graduate of the Columbia University Graduate School of Journalism. He attended the Jewish Theological Seminary for two years while he was an undergraduate at Brooklyn College.

Career 
Sloan has spoken about the economy on television shows such as Charlie Rose, The Colbert Report and regularly on American Public Media's Marketplace found on NPR.

HIs first experience in journalism was as a freshman at Brooklyn College. He had been complaining about the student newspaper when his English professor told him that if he thought he could do a better job, then go to work for the paper.

Sloan began his first job writing, in 1969, with the Charlotte Observer; he originally wanted to be a sports writer, but he was assigned to writing about real estate. In December 1969, he was assigned to business and the economy.

Sloan continued working as a journalist, first as a business reporter for the  Detroit Free Press, (1972-1978) and later, as a staff writer for Money magazine (1982-1984). He worked as an associated editor for Forbes magazine (1979-1981) and as senior editor (1984-1988). He was a syndicated columnist for Newsday, before leaving for Newsweek.

In 1995, Sloan began working for Newsweek as their Wall Street editor. In 2005, during the controversy surrounding Halliburton and Dick Cheney, Sloan wrote in his article, "Halliburton Pays Dearly but Finally Escapes Cheney's Asbestos Mess," noting that "As Cheney's Dresser misadventure shows, today's triumphant deal champ can be tomorrow's chump." Ten months later, In a Mother Jones article, "Bush's Bad Business Empire," Sloan, was quoted from the article, saying "Cheney was a 'CEO who messed up big-time.'"

In 2007, Sloan left Newsweek and began working as Senior Editor at Large, for Fortune magazine. In 2008, Sloan won the Gerald Loeb Award for the seventh time; the prize was given for his story "House of Junk", which showed how subprime mortgages "went bad". In a 2009 story, "Unheeded Warnings," Chris Roush spoke to the fact that journalists had been "waving the red flag" for several years, in the lead up to the Financial crisis of 2007–2008. Roush quoted Sloan as saying "The fact that housing was a bubble was printed a million times."

In July 2014, "Positively Un-American" was published in Fortune, reporting on corporations dodging billions in taxes and leaving taxpayers to pay for their share. The in-depth article, described how the U.S. could be expected to lose approximately $19.5 billion in tax revenue between 2015 and 2024 if corporate tax reform wasn't implemented.

In the article, he included this self-described "rant":

He went on, in the article, to describe how inverters hesitate when it's time to "ante up" and pay their fair share of taxes.

On July 22, 2014, Sloan spoke before the United States Senate Committee on Finance, and suggested in closing, that it would be "absolutely tragic" if Congress allowed politics to stop reforms that were needed and allow the subject to dissolve into soundbites and rhetoric.

Sloan left Fortune in 2014, with his last article published in December 2014. As of 2020, Sloan continues to write as a columnist for the Washington Post.

Awards and recognition
Sloan has received many awards over the span of his more than 50-year career. He was picked as the Business Journalist of the Decade, by Talking Biz News for the first decade of the 21st century. 
 1975 Gerald Loeb Award for Large Newspapers for "Utility Rates: Too High or Too Low?", The Detroit Free Press
 1985 Gerald Loeb Award for Magazines for "Full Speed Ahead - Damn the Torpedoes," Forbes
 1991 Gerald Loeb Award for Commentary for "Deal" columns, Newsday
 1991 John Hancock Award for Excellence in Business and Finance Journalism, Newsday
 1993 Gerald Loeb Award for Commentary for "Deal" columns, Newsday
 1998 Gerald Loeb Award for Commentary for selected columns, Newsweek
 1999 Alumnus of the Year, Columbia School of Journalism
 2001 Gerald Loeb Lifetime Achievement Award
 2001 Distinguished Achievement Award, Society of American Business Editors and Writers
 2008 Gerald Loeb Award for Magazines for "House of Junk,"  Fortune
 2014 Finalist, Best in Business, Government, Society of American Business Editors and Writers, "Positively Un-American," Forbes

References

External links 
 Biography at NewsBios
 
 C-SPAN Q&A interview with Sloan and Geoffrey Colvin, September 30, 2012

American male journalists
Brooklyn College alumni
Columbia University Graduate School of Journalism alumni
Living people
Year of birth missing (living people)
Gerald Loeb Award winners for Columns, Commentary, and Editorials
Fortune (magazine) people
Gerald Loeb Award winners for Large Newspapers
Gerald Loeb Award winners for Magazines
Gerald Loeb Lifetime Achievement Award winners